Mathias Behounek (born 25 June 1975) is a German snowboarder. He competed in the men's parallel giant slalom event at the 2002 Winter Olympics.

References

External links
 

1975 births
Living people
German male snowboarders
Olympic snowboarders of Germany
Snowboarders at the 2002 Winter Olympics
People from Rosenheim
Sportspeople from Upper Bavaria
21st-century German people